is a 2005 action role-playing game developed by Nihon Falcom for Windows. The game is a spin-off of the 1985 action role-playing game Dragon Slayer II: Xanadu. Xanadu Next was released worldwide in English by Xseed Games in 2016. An N-Gage version was developed by ScriptArts and published by Nokia a few months prior to original Japanese release.

Premise 
The player character is a dishonored knight hired by a scholar named Charlotte L. Wells to investigate the ruins of Harlech Island on her behalf. Almost as soon as he begins, however, he is mortally wounded by a mysterious warrior named Dvorak and must undergo a life-saving process which binds him to Harlech. He will now die if he ever leaves – unless he can find the fabled Dragon Slayer sword, which is the only item capable of severing his ties with Harlech and giving him his life back.

In the N-Gage version, the player character is instead a hunter who has been hired by a small town named Marion Berck to find a missing girl named Momo who disappeared after King-Dragon attacked. Since King-Dragon's attack, the villagers have been plagued by mysterious deaths, dying crops, and monster attacks, which you must help with along your journey to find Momo.

Reception

The N-Gage version got mixed reviews, but the Windows version got generally favourable reviews.

References

External links 
 

Role-playing video games
Action role-playing video games
Dragon Slayer (series)
N-Gage games
Video games developed in Japan
Windows games
2005 video games
Nihon Falcom games
Xseed Games games
Multiplayer and single-player video games